Old Town Transit Center, also known as San Diego–Old Town station or Old Town San Diego station, is an intermodal transportation station located in the Old Town neighborhood of San Diego, California. It is served by Amtrak's Pacific Surfliner, the COASTER commuter rail service, and the San Diego Trolley, as well as numerous San Diego Metropolitan Transit System bus lines.

The station is located at the intersection of Rosecrans Street/Taylor Street and Pacific Highway, adjacent to Old Town San Diego State Historic Park and the freeway intersection of Interstate 5 and Interstate 8. It is also located about two miles southeast of SeaWorld San Diego and Mission Bay, providing access to the northernmost beaches in the city of San Diego. Free parking (Park & Ride) for up to 24-hours is available in the Transit Center lots.

History
The Old Town Transit Center was built in the early 1990s, and San Diego Trolley's North/South Line was extended here on June 16, 1996. In November 1997, the line, renamed the Blue Line, was extended into Mission Valley. When the Green Line service was introduced with the opening of the Mission Valley East extension on July 10, 2005, the Blue Line's northern terminus was pushed back to this station, which also served as the Green Line's western terminus. During a system redesign on September 2, 2012, as part of the Trolley Renewal Project, MTS extended the western terminus of the Green Line from this station to 12th & Imperial Bayside Terminal and shortened the Blue Line's northern terminus to America Plaza. The Special Event Line was eliminated; and instead, the Green Line added cars and offer more frequent service to Petco Park, San Diego Convention Center, Aztec Stadium and Viejas Arena at San Diego State University when necessary.

Service

Commuter and intercity rail
The Old Town Transit Center hosts passenger trains operating on Amtrak's Pacific Surfliner intercity rail route and on the COASTER commuter rail line. Of the 22 weekday Amtrak Pacific Surfliner trains operating in San Diego, 18 of them stop at the Old Town Transit Center, though the Surfliner trains operating at Old Town do not offer checked luggage service, and stop at Old Town to board passengers (northbound trains) or detrain passengers (southbound trains) only, respectively.

Amtrak ridership at Old Town Transit Center has exploded between Fiscal Year 2011 and 2013. In Fiscal Year 2011, there were just 22,867 boardings and detrainings at Old Town (which was a 5.79% increase over Fiscal Year 2010). In Fiscal Year 2012, boardings and detrainings at Old Town rose to 61,118, a 167% increase over FY2011. As of Fiscal Year 2013, the Amtrak ridership figure has continued to rise, to 135,749 boardings and detrainings, a further 122% increase over FY2012. (There has been a corresponding decrease in Amtrak boardings at the Santa Fe Depot in Downtown San Diego over this same period, possibly indicating that some Amtrak boardings have been relocating from Santa Fe Depot to Old Town over the past two years.) Of the 74 California stations served by Amtrak, the Old Town Transit Center was the 25th-busiest in Fiscal Year 2013, boarding or detraining an average of approximately 372 passengers daily.

San Diego Trolley
Old Town Transit Center is also a light rail station on the San Diego Trolley's Green Line. This station originally served as that line's terminus, until a system realignment in September 2012 extended the Green Line though Old Town to Downtown San Diego.

The Trolley's Mid-Coast extension that was completed in November 2021 extends to serve the University City area. In July 2015, a 30-year naming rights agreement between MTS and UC San Diego Health was announced; as a result of this agreement, the Blue Line will be renamed "UC San Diego Blue Line" and the Old Town Transit Center will become "Old Town UC San Diego Health South".

Bus service
Old Town also operates as a bus transit center for San Diego Metropolitan Transit System's routes 8, 9, 10, 28, 30, 35, 44, 83, 88, and 105. There is an underground pedestrian tunnel linking bus terminals on both sides of the station with the trolley/train areas. Old Town is also served by University of San Diego shuttles.

The station is also served by San Diego International Airport's San Diego Flyer shuttle which operates every 20 to 30 minutes between the Old Town Transit Center, Terminal 1 and Terminal 2. The station also sees service from shuttle buses to Viejas Casino.

Station layout
There are four tracks; two tracks are designated for the San Diego Trolley services, while the other two tracks are used for COASTER, Amtrak, and BNSF freight service.

See also

 List of San Diego Trolley stations

References

External links 

COASTER Stations
Old Town Transit Center – SDMTS
Old Town San Diego Amtrak Station – USA RailGuide (TrainWeb)
Old Town San Diego State Historic Park (California State Parks)

Amtrak stations in San Diego County, California
Blue Line (San Diego Trolley)
Green Line (San Diego Trolley)
North County Transit District stations
San Diego Trolley stations in San Diego
Transit centers in the United States
Bus stations in San Diego County, California
Railway stations in San Diego
Railway stations in the United States opened in 1994
1994 establishments in California